Driver is an unincorporated community in Mississippi County, Arkansas, United States.

Education
Residents are zoned to Rivercrest School District (formerly South Mississippi County School District). The public high school is Rivercrest High School.

References

Unincorporated communities in Mississippi County, Arkansas
Unincorporated communities in Arkansas